New Zealand at the 1952 Summer Olympics was represented by a team of 14 competitors (and one travelling reserve) and three officials. Selection of the team for the Games in Helsinki, Finland, was the responsibility of the New Zealand Olympic and British Empire Games Association. New Zealand's flagbearer at the opening ceremony was Harold Cleghorn.  The New Zealand team finished equal 24th on the medal table, winning a total of three medals, one of which was gold.

Medal tables

Athletics

Track

Field

Cycling

Track
Men's 1000 m time trial

Men's sprint

Men's tandem

Rowing

In 1952, seven rowing competitions were held, and New Zealand entered a single boat: a coxed four. The competition was for men only; women would first row at the 1976 Summer Olympics. Hector McLeod travelled to the Summer Olympics as a reserve but did not compete.

Swimming

Weightlifting

Officials
Chef de mission – Jack Squire

References

External links 
New Zealand Olympic Committee – Games Profile: 1952 Helsinki

Nations at the 1952 Summer Olympics
1952
Summer Olympics